Saccharibacillus kuerlensis is a  Gram-positive and  aerobic bacteria from the genus of Saccharibacillus which has been isolated from desert soil from the desert of Kuerle in China.

References

Paenibacillaceae
Bacteria described in 2009